Green Tree is a borough in Allegheny County, Pennsylvania, United States, and a suburb of Pittsburgh. The population was 4,941 at the 2020 census.

The town is the hometown of U.S. Congressman and 2012 Republican presidential candidate Ron Paul and Star Trek/Heroes star Zachary Quinto, both of whom were born in nearby Pittsburgh. Green Tree is connected to Pittsburgh via the Fort Pitt Tunnel.

History
Settled in 1793, the area stayed rural until the late 1800s, with paintings of the time showing farmland and a vineyard. The community took its name from the local Green Tree Hotel. Rook Station on the Wabash Pittsburgh Terminal Railway opened in 1904 which heralded an industrialisation of the area and the opening of a railroad yard and roundhouse.

Government and politics

Geography
Green Tree is located at  (40.414969, -80.049800).

Surrounding communities
Green Tree has six borders, five with Pittsburgh neighborhoods: Oakwood and Westwood to the north, Ridgemont to the northeast, Banksville to the east, and East Carnegie to the west.  The other border is with Scott Township to the south.

Demographics

As of the census of 2000, there were 4,719 people, 1,974 households, and 1,383 families residing in the borough. The population density was 2,247.7 people per square mile (867.6/km2). There were 2,026 housing units at an average density of 965.0 per square mile (372.5/km2). The racial makeup of the borough was 96.21% White, 0.53% African American, 1.95% Asian, 0.04% from other races, and 1.27% from two or more races. Hispanic or Latino of any race were 0.66% of the population. 22.0% were of German, 20.5% Irish, 16.4% Italian, 8.9% Polish and 7.8% English ancestry according to Census 2000.

There were 1,974 households, out of which 24.2% had children under the age of 18 living with them, 60.1% were married couples living together, 6.8% had a female householder with no husband present, and 29.9% were non-families. 26.2% of all households were made up of individuals, and 11.7% had someone living alone who was 65 years of age or older. The average household size was 2.39 and the average family size was 2.89.

In the borough the population was spread out, with 19.4% under the age of 18, 5.6% from 18 to 24, 25.6% from 25 to 44, 27.9% from 45 to 64, and 21.4% who were 65 years of age or older. The median age was 45 years. For every 100 females, there were 91.2 males. For every 100 females age 18 and over, there were 88.1 males.

The median income for a household in the borough was $54,159, and the median income for a family was $63,814. Males had a median income of $42,304 versus $33,438 for females. The per capita income for the borough was $27,480. About 1.7% of families and 2.8% of the population were below the poverty line, including 3.1% of those under age 18 and 3.4% of those age 65 or over.

Economy
Wexford Health Sources has its headquarters in Foster Plaza Two in Green Tree.

The U.S. Department of the Interior's Office of Surface Mining has its Appalachian Regional Coordination Center, including the Pittsburgh Field office and the National Mine Map Repository, in Three Parkway Center in Green Tree.

References

External links

 Green Tree Borough official website
 Green Tree Public Library

Populated places established in 1885
Pittsburgh metropolitan area
Boroughs in Allegheny County, Pennsylvania
1885 establishments in Pennsylvania